Adriano Alves dos Santos (born July 1, 1985) is a Brazilian football player who plays for Treze. He is André Alves' brother.

References

Ferencvarosi TC fansite

1985 births
Living people
Brazilian footballers
Association football defenders
Campeonato Brasileiro Série A players
Campeonato Brasileiro Série B players
Campeonato Brasileiro Série C players
Campeonato Brasileiro Série D players
Saudi Professional League players
Nemzeti Bajnokság I players
Clube Náutico Capibaribe players
Oeste Futebol Clube players
Associação Desportiva São Caetano players
Atlético Clube Goianiense players
Najran SC players
Al-Raed FC players
Ferencvárosi TC footballers
América Futebol Clube (RN) players
Treze Futebol Clube players
Brazilian expatriate sportspeople in Hungary
Brazilian expatriate sportspeople in Saudi Arabia
Expatriate footballers in Hungary
Expatriate footballers in Saudi Arabia
People from Dourados
Sportspeople from Mato Grosso do Sul